National Route 363 is a national highway of Japan connecting Meitō-ku, Nagoya and Nakatsugawa, Gifu in Japan, with a total length of .

See also

References

363
Roads in Aichi Prefecture
Roads in Gifu Prefecture